In aviation, the flight length refers to the distance of a flight. When it comes to the generic length factors of a flight it includes the speed, distance & stops of a flight.  Commercial flights are often categorized into long-, medium- or short-haul by commercial airlines based on flight length, although there is no international standard definition and many airlines use air time or geographic boundaries instead.

The related term flight duration is defined as to the amount of time a single flight (segment) is scheduled to take from pushing back at the departure gate to arriving at its destination gate. It is formally defined by ICAO (International Civil Aviation Organization) as "The total time from the moment an aeroplane first moves for the purpose of taking off until the moment it finally comes to rest at the end of the flight" also referred to colloquially as "chocks to chocks" time.

Flight duration is formally measured in hours & minutes as it is irrespective of geographic distance traveled. A route's flight duration can be affected by many things such as anticipated routings, weather, traffic, or taxiing times. Scheduled durations for the same route and airline can also vary on what aircraft is used.

A flight's duration can also be described using the aviation term of "Flight Haul Type",  such as "Short Haul" or "Long Haul" that have multiple different definitions depending on originating sources.  See the below table for some more prominent examples:

Route category definitions

Flight Haul Type terms are often used to describe flight length by aviation entities such as airlines, airports, and government authorities.  The definitions vary as they are subjective for that entities' purposes and provide a specific message to their customers how they view a flight as being long or short.  Some examples include:

Asia & Australia
 Hong Kong International Airport considers destinations in North and South Americas, Europe, the Middle East, Africa, Southwest Pacific and the Indian Subcontinent long-haul and all others are short-haul.
 Japan Air Lines defines routes to Europe and North America as long-haul and all other flights as short-haul.
 Qatar Airways  defines all flights from Qatar to the Americas, Australia, and New Zealand as Ultra-long-haul, and all other flights as medium or long-haul.
 Virgin Australia defines domestic flights as within Australia, short-haul as those to South East Asia/Pacific and long-haul as those to Abu Dhabi or Los Angeles.

Europe
 The European Union defines any passenger flight between city pairs separated by a great circle distance less than 1,500 km to be short-haul, between 1,500 and 3,500 km as medium-haul, and all flights greater than 3,500 km to be long-haul routes.
 The Association of European Airlines defined Long-haul as flights to Americas, sub-Saharan Africa, Asia, Australasia and medium-haul as flights to North Africa and Middle East. 
 The now defunct airline Air Berlin defined short- and medium-haul as flights to Europe/North Africa and long-haul as those to the rest of the world.
 Air France defines short-haul as domestic, medium-haul as within Europe/North Africa and long haul as the rest of the world.

North America

Aircraft category definitions 
Flight Haul Type terms are sometimes used when referring to commercial aircraft.  Some commercial carriers choose to refer to their aircraft using flight haul type terms, for example:
 Delta Air Lines referred to its Boeing 717, MD-88 and MD-90 as short-haul domestic aircraft; Boeing 757, Boeing 737, Airbus A319 and A321 as long-haul domestic; and its transoceanic Boeing 757, 767, 777 and Airbus A330 as long-haul.
 Lufthansa classifies its fleet as: long-haul for wide-body aircraft such as the Airbus A330/Airbus A340, Airbus A350, Airbus A380, and Boeing 747; medium-haul for narrow-body aircraft like the Airbus A320 and 737 families; and short-haul for regional jets like the Embraer E-Jets and the Bombardier CRJ-900.
 TUI Airways refers to their Boeing 737 as a short and mid-haul airliner and the Boeing 767 and 787 as long haul.

While they are capable of flying further, long-haul capable wide-bodies are often used on shorter trips.

Superlative flights

Shortest commercial flight
The Westray to Papa Westray flight in Orkney, operated by Loganair, is the shortest commercial flight in the world over 2.8 km (1.7 mi) in two minutes scheduled flight time including taxiing.

Longest commercial flight 

The world's longest ever commercial flight was Air Tahiti Nui Flight TN64 in early 2020. Due to the COVID-19 pandemic and the impossibility of transit in the USA through Los Angeles International Airport, Air Tahiti Nui scheduled and operated in March and April 2020 Flight TN64 as a non-stop flight between Papeete and Paris Charles de Gaulle, using a Boeing 787-9 and covering 15,715 km (9,765 mi; 8,485 nmi). in a scheduled time of 16 hours and 20 minutes.  As of 2023 continues to hold the record for the longest ever scheduled commercial nonstop flight (by great circle distance) as well as the world's longest domestic flight.

From November 9, 2020, Singapore Airlines SQ 23/24 is the world's longest active commercial flight between Singapore and JFK Airport New York City, USA, covering  in around 18 hours and 40 minutes, operated by an Airbus A350-900ULR.

Distinctions

Absolute distance versus flight length

The absolute distance between two points is the great-circle distance, which is always the shortest geographical route.  In the example (right), the aircraft travelling westward from North America to Japan is following a great-circle route extending northward towards the Arctic region. The apparent curve of the route is a result of distortion when plotted onto a conventional map projection and makes the route appear to be longer than it really is.  Stretching a string between  North America and Japan on a globe will demonstrate why this really is the shortest route despite appearances.

The actual flight length is the length of the track flown across the ground in practice, which is usually longer than the ideal great-circle and is influenced by a number of factors such as the need to avoid bad weather, wind direction and speed, fuel economy, navigational restrictions and other requirements. In the example, easterly flights from Japan to North America are shown taking a longer, more southerly, route than the shorter great-circle; this is to take advantage of the favourable jet stream, a fast, high-altitude tail-wind, that assists the aircraft along its ground track saving more time and fuel than the geographically shortest route.

Flight Length versus Flight Duration example 
Even with the same length, a route's flight duration can be affected by anticipated routings, seasonal weather, traffic, taxiing time, or equipment capabilities as seen in this example:

On the Luxembourg to Bucharest route operated by LuxAir, the scheduled flight length remains constant while the flight duration varies depending on aircraft used:

 On Thursday mornings, LuxAir operates a DHC-8 Turboprop with a scheduled duration of approximately 3 hours.
 While on Saturday mornings, LuxAir operates a Embraer 190 Jet Airliner, which reduces the scheduled duration of the flight down to approximately 2 hours 20 minutes.

See also
 Endurance (aeronautics)
 Flight distance record
 International flight
 List of regional airliners
 Longest Flights
 Non-stop flight
 Range (aeronautics)
 Short-haul flight ban

References

External links 
 The Great Circle Mapper Displays Great Circle flight routes on a Map And calculates distance and duration
 Flight-time and -distance calculator
 Air Miles Calculator
 Flight Duration Calculator
 Flight Distance Calculator Flight routes duration and Great Circle Mapper

Civil aviation